Jerome de Angelis (1567 – 4 December 1623) was an Italian Jesuit missionary to Japan. He was beatified in 1867.

Life
He was born Girolamo degli Angeli at Castro-Giovanni, Sicily.
He studied law in Palermo before entering the Society of Jesus at Messina in 1586. He was assigned to the Japanese mission and left Lisbon in April 1596, in company with 7 other Jesuits destined for Japan.  Storms disrupted his journey and took him to Brazil, Puerto Rico and England (after being captured by an English ship).  He and Charles Spinola spent 2 months together in England before getting back to Lisbon in January 1598.   

He set out again in 1599 with Charles Spinola and three others, bound for the College in Goa, to complete his studies in anticipation of ordination. 

Degli Angelis arrived in Nagasaki in 1602 and worked in the area of what is now Tokyo. He remained there after the publication of the edict expelling all Christian missionaries from the country in 1614.

In 1618, the first European on Hokkaido, he was the first missionary to reach Yezo and the Ainu people. De Angelis, after making many converts to Christianity, seeing that his neophytes were cruelly persecuted because of his presence among them and his preaching, gave himself up to the authorities in 1623. Condemned to death, he underwent public execution by fire.

Notes

References

1567 births
1623 deaths
16th-century Italian Jesuits
17th-century Italian Jesuits
Italian Roman Catholic missionaries
Italian beatified people
17th-century venerated Christians
17th-century executions by Japan
People executed by Japan by burning
Italian people executed abroad
Jesuit missionaries in Japan
Italian expatriates in Japan
17th-century Roman Catholic martyrs
Jesuit martyrs